Progress 10 was a Soviet unmanned Progress cargo spacecraft, which was launched in June 1980 to resupply the Salyut 6 space station.

Spacecraft
Progress 10 was a Progress 7K-TG spacecraft. The tenth of forty three to be launched, it had the serial number 110. The Progress 7K-TG spacecraft was the first generation Progress, derived from the Soyuz 7K-T and intended for uncrewed logistics missions to space stations in support of the Salyut programme. On some missions the spacecraft were also used to adjust the orbit of the space station.

The spacecraft were powered by chemical batteries, and could operate in free flight for up to three days, remaining docked to the station for up to thirty.

Launch
Progress 10 launched on 29 June 1980 from the Baikonur Cosmodrome in the Kazakh SSR. It used a Soyuz-U rocket.

Docking
Progress 10 docked with the aft port of Salyut 6 on 1 July 1980 at 05:53 UTC, and was undocked on 17 July 1980 at 22:21 UTC.

Decay
It remained in orbit until 19 July 1980, when it was deorbited. The deorbit burn occurred at 01:47 UTC and the mission ended at around 02:30 UTC.

See also

 1980 in spaceflight
 List of Progress missions
 List of uncrewed spaceflights to Salyut space stations

References

Progress (spacecraft) missions
1980 in the Soviet Union
Spacecraft launched in 1980
Spacecraft which reentered in 1980
Spacecraft launched by Soyuz-U rockets